The Vicars’ Court or Vicars’ Choral in Lincoln, is situated in the Minster Yard to the south of Lincoln Cathedral. It was founded as a college of priests by Bishop Sutton in the late 13th century. These priests would take services in the Cathedral in the absence of the Prebendaries. The Vicars‘ Choral of Lincoln is one of eight such colleges in England, and it is also one of the earliest and best preserved. The great majority of the building survives (although not the hall and the chapel). By 1305 the hall, the kitchen and certain chambers were finished. In 1328 lay brothers were admitted and further houses were built for them During the English Civil War, the buildings were badly damaged and afterwards were converted into four houses.

Architecture
The buildings consists of four irregular two-storeyed ranges set around a spacious sloping turfed courtyard. The entrance range facing the cathedral with an entrance gateway  is from 14th century and has the arms of Bishop Gravesend above the entrance arch.  The northern block, on the left, has a near-central 14th century doorway, with a hood mould and mask stops, flanked to left by a four-centred arched window with another hood mould, and a small pointed arched casement window. The southern range has a central flat headed doorway with a keystone and a shield above it. To right are a flat headed window with a three pointed arched lights, and a moulded doorway with hood moulds which are 19th century. Beyond is a single gabled buttress.  Above are a large gabled dormer windows to left with two smaller dormer windows to right. Above is a central canted wooden oriel window on a shaped bracket. At the back are four brick and stone external buttressed chimneystacks, and a garderobe tower. The interior has several intact garderobes, and at the north end there is a ground floor medieval ceiling with transverse chamfered beams on double corbels.

See also: Residences of other Vicars’ Choral
Vicars' Close, Wells
Vicars' Court, Lincoln
College of Minor Canons, St Paul's London 
Exeter 
Hereford 
Bedern, York

See also: Other Residences in Lincoln Cathedral Close and Minster Yard
The Old Deanery, Lincoln
Lincoln Medieval Bishop's Palace

References

Bibliography
Antram N (revised), Pevsner N & Harris J, (1989), The Buildings of England: Lincolnshire, Yale University Press.
Jones S. (1987) The Survey of Ancient Houses in Lincoln Vol. 2.   40-62
Padley J.S., (1851) Selections from the Ancient Monastic Ecclesiastical and Domestic edifices of Lincolnshire, Lincoln.
Stocker, D.A., (1999). The College of the Vicars Choral of York Minster at Bedern: architectural fragments, The Archaeology of York 10/4, CBA: York. .

External links
British Listed Buildings 

Buildings and structures in Lincoln, England